Kalle Varonen (born April 11, 1974, in Ulvila, Finland) is a retired freestyle sprint swimmer from Finland. Varonen competed for his native country at 1996 Summer Olympics in Atlanta, Georgia. His best result was a 12th place with the men's 4×100 metres freestyle relay team, alongside Jani Sievinen, Antti Kasvio, and Janne Blomqvist.

References
Profile

1974 births
Living people
People from Ulvila
Finnish male freestyle swimmers
Swimmers at the 1996 Summer Olympics
Olympic swimmers of Finland
Sportspeople from Satakunta